Junín is a department and region in the central highlands and westernmost Peruvian Amazon. Its capital is Huancayo.

Geography

The region has a very heterogeneous topography. The western range located near the border with the Lima Region, has snowy and ice-covered peaks. On the east, there are high glacier valleys which end up in high plateaus (Altiplano). Among them is the Junín Plateau that is located between the cities of La Oroya and Cerro de Pasco.

The Mantaro Valley becomes wider before Jauja up to the limit with the Huancavelica Region. This area concentrates a large share of the region's population. Towards the east, near the jungle, there is an abundance of narrow and deep canyons, with highly inclined hillsides, covered by woods under low-lying clouds.

The Waytapallana mountain range is located in the south central area of the region. This range holds a great fault which is the reason earthquakes happen in the area. The upper jungle, with valleys of great length, modelled by the Tulumayu, Pawqartampu, Perené and Ene rivers, is located on the eastern side of the region.

Lake Junin, the largest lake entirely within Peru, is located in the region, except for its northernmost tip which belongs to the Pasco Region.

Junín Region is also home to Mount Toromocho.

Boundaries
The Junín Region borders the regions of Pasco in the north, Ucayali in the northeast and Cusco in the east. The Mantaro River marks the border of the region with the Ayacucho and Huancavelica regions in the south and in the west it is bordered by the Lima Region.

Climate
The Junín Region has an average annual temperature of 13.1 °C (56 °F), a maximum high of 17 °C (62 °F) and a minimum low of 0 °C (32 °F).

The rainy season runs from November to April, and from December to March in tropical areas.

Political division
The region is divided into nine provinces, which are composed of 123 districts (distritos, singular: distrito). The provinces and their capitals are:

Demographics

Languages 
According to the 2007 Peru Census, the language learnt first by most of the residents was Spanish (86.63%) followed by Quechua (9.29%).  The Quechua varieties spoken in Junín are Huanca Quechua (in the Southwest), Yaru Quechua (in the Northwest, especially in Tarma Province). The following table shows the results concerning the language learnt first in the Junín Region by province:

History 

Until the arrival of the Incas the eastern plains of the Junín region, known in Quechua as "Pampas," were inhabited by the Yanesha' and the Asháninka people, who lived a hunter-gatherer lifestyle and tended to be hostile towards outsiders. Meanwhile, the southwestern Mantaro Valley was inhabited by the Huancas. Sapa Inca Pachacuti conquered this region in 1460, bringing it under the domain of the Inca Empire. Huancayo became the region's main highway rest stop on the Inca Trail.

Woolen mills (known in Spanish as "obrajes" or "mills") were created during the viceroyalty, where the tissue and its craft became a tradition that continues today. On September 13, 1825, Simón Bolívar issued a decree creating what is now the Junín Region, to commemorate his victory in the Battle of Junín, the last real cavalry charge in South America where no shot was fired. Major events of national importance occurred during this period: Huancayo hosted the Assembly that issued the 1839 Constitution and on December 3, 1854, Ramón Castilla signed a decree that granted freedom to Afro-Peruvian slaves.

Places of interest 
 Asháninka Communal Reserve
 Chacamarca Historical Sanctuary
 Convent of Santa Rosa de Ocopa
 Gran Pajonal 
 Nor Yauyos-Cochas Landscape Reserve
 Otishi National Park
 Pampa Hermosa Reserved Zone

Sources

External links
 Gobierno Regional Junín – Junín Regional Government official website

Regions of Peru